Interstate 490 may refer to the following Interstate Highways in the United States:
Interstate 490 (New York) in Rochester, New York
Interstate 490 (Ohio) in Cleveland, Ohio
Interstate 490 (Illinois) currently being built west of Chicago

90-4
4